Palpares is an antlion genus in the Myrmeleontidae family.

Species

 Palpares abyssinicus
 Palpares adspersus
 Palpares aegrotus
 Palpares aeschnoides
 Palpares alopecinus
 Palpares amitinus
 Palpares angustus
 Palpares apicatus
 Palpares arcangelii
 Palpares astarte
 Palpares auratus
 Palpares bayoni
 Palpares caffer
 Palpares campanai
 Palpares cataractae
 Palpares cephalotes
 Palpares cognatus
 Palpares contrarius
 Palpares decaryi
 Palpares digitatus
 Palpares dispar
 Palpares elegantulus
 Palpares falcatus
 Palpares fulvus
 Palpares geniculatus
 Palpares germaini
 Palpares gratiosus
 Palpares hispanus
 Palpares immensus
 Palpares inclemens
 Palpares incommodus
 Palpares infimus
 Palpares insularis
 Palpares kalahariensis
 Palpares karrooanus
 Palpares lentus
 Palpares libelluloides
 Palpares martini
 Palpares nigrescens
 Palpares nobilis
 Palpares normalis
 Palpares nyicanus
 Palpares obscuripennis
 Palpares obsoletus
 Palpares papilionoides
 Palpares pardaloides
 Palpares pauliani
 Palpares percheronii
 Palpares radiatus
 Palpares rajasthanicus
 Palpares schoutedeni
 Palpares schrammi
 Palpares selysi
 Palpares sinicus
 Palpares sobrinus
 Palpares speciosus
 Palpares stuhlmanni
 Palpares submaculatus
 Palpares tigroides
 Palpares torridus
 Palpares trichogaster
 Palpares umbrosus
 Palpares venustus
 Palpares weelei
 Palpares zebratus
 Palpares zebroides

References

External links
Banks, N., 1913. The neuropterous genus Palpares. Annals of the Entomological Society of America, 6(2), pp.171-191.
Mansell, M.W. and Erasmus, B.F.N., 2002. Southern African biomes and the evolution of Palparini (Insecta: Neuroptera: Myrmeleontidae). Acta Zoologica Academiae Scientarium Hungarica, 48, pp.175-184.

Myrmeleontidae genera
Myrmeleontidae